Nina Bendigkeit was the first female singer of Blutengel together with Kati Roloff known for her spoken vocals.

Career 
She only sang on their debut album, Child Of Glass. As she left the band she started doing photography. She also contributed to Seelenkrank albums during 1997. She did the Blutengel's Angel Dust promotional photoshoot in 2002. Nina had her own band, Formalin . She left the electro-/industrial project in February 2009.

Discography

With Seelenkrank 
 1997: Engelschrei – Album vocals and lyrics in "Painful Innocence", "Vampires Diner" and backing vocals in "Fallen Angel"
 2005: Engelschrei Re-release – Album

With Blutengel 
 1998: Awake the Machines Vol. 2: Blutengel - vocals and lyrics in "Love" – Compilation track
 1999: Child of Glass – Album vocals and lyrics in "Desire" "Suicide" and "Footworship" (with Kati Roloff).

Guest appearances
 1998: Terminal Choice: Navigator – Album
→ Vocals and lyrics in "Tenderness" which for a printing mistake it appeared as track 11 - "Navigator II" on the album art
 1999: Culture Kultür: DNA Slaves – EP
→ Vocals and lyrics in "Deep"
 2008: Wynardtage: "The Forgotten Sins 2002-2005" - Album
→ Vocals and lyrics in "Protection"

 Formalin 
 2004: plagued.mind.dissection – Album vocals and lyrics in "Hominis Nocturni", "Belief"
 2005: Painful thoughts – MCD
 2005: Chronicles Ov Faith & Disease – Album vocals and lyrics in "Atomic", "True faith", "Lost"
 2007: intoxication – strictly limited edition MCD vocals and lyrics in "Breath Control", "Atomic", "True Faith"
 2008: Formalin liveset at Schlagstrom Festival –  vocals and lyrics in "Clinic", "Cold Heart"
 2008: Section Blue – Album vocals and lyrics in "Breath Control", "Velvet Sinphony", "Atomic"

 Compilations 
 2005: Lost in Darkness Dark Underground Compilation_Volume III – vocals and lyrics in "True faith"
 2006: Violence Nation (Rupal Records) – vocals and lyrics in "Atomic"
 2006: The Vital Terms of Rupal Records'' – vocals and lyrics in "Velvet Sinphony"

External links
 Formalin Nina's electro-/industrial project
 Ozelotseye Nina Bendigkeit Photography
 BE's Official website (in German)

German women singers
Living people
Year of birth missing (living people)